Mount Bahaya (Somali language: Buurta Baxaya, sometimes spelled Mount Bahaja), also known as Mount Bahaya, is the fourth-tallest mountain in Somalia, after the triple-peaked mountains Mount Shimbiris, Mount Surud Cad, and Mount Warraq. According to one 1974 map from the Defense Mapping Agency, it could even be  in height.

With a prominence of 1,543 to 1,613 meters, it is an Ultra-prominent peak, making it the 74th to 58th most prominent peak in Africa, and the only definite one in the country of Somalia. The mountain is highly elongated in a northwest-southeast direction, leading some to list the southern and northern ends as Bahaya and Karkoor, respectively.

Mount Bahaya is the tallest peak in the Fadhisame Mountains, which are in northeastern Somalia. The range itself is a small section of the larger Cal Miskaad Mountains, which define the northern Horn of Africa in most of Somalia, and which extend from Karin, Bari to further east, their peaks forming the Socotra Archipelago. Bahaya, along with the surrounding range, is mostly made up of the deeply-eroded remnants of an ancient volcanic chain.

References

Bahaya